The Verkhoyansk Range (Verkhojanskiy Khrebet; , Üöhee Caaŋı sis xayata) is a mountain range in the Sakha Republic, Russia near the settlement of Verkhoyansk, well-known for its frigid climate. It is part of the East Siberian Mountains.

The range lies just west of the boundary of the Eurasian and the North American tectonic plates. The mountains were formed by folding, and represent an anticline.

The Verkhoyansk Range was covered by glaciers during the Last Glacial Period and the mountains in the northern section, such as the Orulgan Range, display a typical Alpine relief.

There are coal, silver, lead, tin and zinc deposits in the mountains.

Geography

Rising from the shores of the Buor-Khaya Gulf in the north, it runs southwards spanning roughly 1000 km (600 mi.) across Yakutia, east of the Central Yakutian Lowland, and west of the Chersky Range, reaching the Lena Plateau to the south and the Yudoma-Maya Highlands to the southeast. It forms a vast arc between the Lena and Aldan rivers to the west and the Yana River to the east. 

The Verkhoyansk Range has a higher southeastern prolongation, the Suntar-Khayata Range, that is occasionally considered as a separate range system. The Ulakhan-Bom, highest point , Sette-Daban, highest point , Skalisty Range (Rocky Range), highest point , are located at the southern end and were also considered separate ranges in classical geographic works. The two ranges were surveyed in 1934 by geologist Yuri Bilibin (1901—1952) together with mining engineer Evgeny Bobin (1897—1941) in the course of an expedition sent by the government of the Soviet Union. After conducting the first topographic survey of the area Bilibin established that the Skalisty and Sette-Daban mountain chains belong to the Verkhoyansk Mountain System. Bilibin and Bobin also explored for the first time the Yudoma-Maya Highlands, located to the southeast of the Ulakhan-Bom/Sette-Daban/Skalisty ranges.

Subranges
Besides the Orulgan, the system of the range comprises a number of subranges, as well as a plateau, including the following:
Northern section —north of the Arctic Circle
Kharaulakh Range, highest point 
Tuora Sis, highest point 
Kunga Range, highest point 
Dzhardzhan Range, highest point 
Sietinden Range, highest point  
Kular Range, highest point 
Byrandia Range, highest point 
Kuyellyakh Range (Кюельляхский хребет), highest point 
Southern section —south of the Arctic Circle 
Echysky Massif, highest point 
Arkachan Plateau, highest point 
Tagindzhin Range, highest point  
Muosuchan Range, highest point 
Bygyn Range, highest point 
Kuturgin Range, highest point 
Munni Range, highest point 
Kelter Range, highest point 
Sorkin Range, highest point 
Ust-Vilyuy Range, highest point  (close to the Lena) 
Chochum Range, highest point 
Sordogin Range, highest point 
Khabakh Range, highest point  (east)
Khunkhadin Range, highest point  (east)
Far southern section (Part of the greater Verkhoyansk Range, together with the Suntar Khayata)
Kyllakh Range, highest point 
Ulakhan-Bom, highest point ,
Sette-Daban, highest point 
Skalisty Range, highest point

Hydrography

The Verkhoyansk mountain system separates the basins of the Lena River to the west and southwest and the Omoloy and Yana to the east and northeast. It is deeply cut by riverine intermontane basins. Many right tributaries of the Lena flow westwards, having their sources in the range, including the Kyundyudey, Undyulyung, Begidyan, Sobolokh-Mayan, Menkere, Dzhardzhan, Uel-Siktyakh, Kuranakh-Siktyakh, Byosyuke, Dyanyshka, Lyapiske, Belyanka, Munni, Kele, Tukulan, Tumara, Nuora and Baray, among others. To the northeast flow left tributaries of the Omoloy such as the Kuranakh-Yuryakh, Arga-Yuryakh, Bukhuruk and Sietinde. The Tompo cuts across the range in its southern part flowing from its source in the Suntar Khayata. The valley of the Aldan is located to the south, where the river makes a wide bend.

From the eastern slopes flow rivers Dulgalakh and Sartang, which form river Yana further north, as well as its tributaries Bytantay, Nelgese, Derbeke and Baky, among others. 

Rivers in the mountainous areas are usually frozen between September and May.

Climate and flora
The world's lowest temperatures for inhabited places have been recorded in this region, and there is quite deep snow cover for most of the year.

The mountain range is home to an alpine tundra, supporting various species of mosses and lichens. Some sparsely-wooded forests of mainly larch and dwarf Siberian pine are found on smooth slopes.

See also
List of mountains and hills of Russia
Chersky Range

References

External links

 NASA picture
 Chapter 5 Precambrian of the Cover - ScienceDirect

 
East Siberian Mountains